The 1982 Texas–Arlington Mavericks football team was an American football team that represented the University of Texas at Arlington in the Southland Conference during the 1982 NCAA Division I-AA football season. In their ninth year under head coach Harold Elliott, the team compiled a 3–8 record.

Schedule

Roster

References

Texas–Arlington
Texas–Arlington Mavericks football seasons
Texas–Arlington Mavericks football